Brian Gregory Perk (born July 21, 1989) is an American former soccer player.

Career

College and Amateur
Perk appeared in goal for the UCLA Bruins between 2006 and 2009, where he won numerous individual honors, including – 2006 Top Drawer Soccer All-Freshman second team 2007 Pre-season All-American selection by Soccer America and Pac-10 Player of the Week for Sept. 4–10 and  Top Drawer Soccer Team of the Week on October 15, 2008 Pac-10 Player of the Week for Oct 21 (2009)Named Pac-10 Player of the Week twice (week of Oct 18, Sept. 6) and  Second-team NSCAA All-American and first-team All-Pac-10 honoree and Top Drawer Soccer Team of the Season .

During his college years Perk also played in the USL Premier Development League for Seattle Wolves.

Professional
Perk was drafted in the fourth round (49th overall) of the 2010 MLS SuperDraft by Philadelphia Union.  He debuted on July 14, 2010, coming in as a second-half substitute in a friendly against Celtic F.C. He would also play in the second half of another friendly against Manchester United on July 21, 2010 at Lincoln Financial Field.

Perk was waived by Philadelphia on July 30, 2010 without ever making a first team appearance for the club.  Shortly after his release, he was claimed off waivers by the Los Angeles Galaxy on August 4, 2010.

In his first career MLS appearance on July 4, 2011 for Los Angeles Galaxy vs. Seattle Sounders FC, he saved a penalty kick taken by Fredy Montero in the first half and secured a clean sheet after the final whistle.

International
Perk was the starting goalkeeper for the USA at the 2009 FIFA U-20 World Cup and the 2009 CONCACAF U-20 Championship.

Honors

LA Galaxy
MLS Cup (3): 2011, 2012, 2014
Major League Soccer Supporters' Shield (2): 2010, 2011
Major League Soccer Western Conference Championship (1): 2011, 2012

References

External links

1989 births
Living people
2009 CONCACAF U-20 Championship players
American soccer players
Association football goalkeepers
LA Galaxy players
LA Galaxy II players
Major League Soccer players
People from Rancho Santa Margarita, California
People from Yorba Linda, California
Philadelphia Union draft picks
Philadelphia Union players
Soccer players from California
UCLA Bruins men's soccer players
USL Championship players
USL League Two players
United States men's under-20 international soccer players
United States men's youth international soccer players
Washington Crossfire players